Grim Reapers Motorcycle Club is an American motorcycle club founded in Louisville, Kentucky in 1965. The club is primarily active in the Midwestern United States and only accepts Harley-Davidson riders.

History
The Grim Reapers MC was founded as a three-piece patch in Louisville, Kentucky, in 1965. In the United States, such motorcycle clubs are considered "outlaw" as they are not sanctioned by the American Motorcyclist Association (AMA) and do not observe the AMA's rules. Instead the Grim Reapers have their own set of bylaws based on the values of outlaw biker culture. In 1970, the club provided security for the Kickapoo Creek Rock Festival, held on Memorial Day weekend in 1970 near Heyworth, Illinois.

Operation Iron Horse
In 1999, charges were brought against 18 members of the club, including the national president, as part of the four-year "Operation Iron Horse", a state and federal investigation under the Racketeer Influenced and Corrupt Organizations Act (RICO Act) into motorcycle clubs in the Mid-West of the United States. The 18 defendants were indicted for selling drugs and dealing stolen motorcycles. The Grim Reapers had purchased 120 kilograms of cocaine worth a total of around $3 million from 1988 to 1998.

Extent
Before Operation Iron Horse, there were club chapters in states from North Dakota to Florida, but according to the club's website, there are currently chapters in Kentucky, Tennessee, Indiana, and Illinois. In Iowa, the Grim Reapers were the first motorcycle club established in that state.

Symbols and decorations
The Grim Reapers MC takes its name and iconography from the symbolic personification of death, the Grim Reaper. The club's name is emblazoned on the top rocker of the three-piece patch. The center patch features the Grim Reaper in red holding a scythe, and is referred to as "the Ghost." The territory where the chapter operates appears on the bottom rocker. An "MC" patch appears to the right of the Ghost, when facing the cut. The cut also features a triangular front patch depicting a scythe over the club's initials, with one letter of the MC's motto, "FTW", in each corner of the triangle.

Other clubs
The 'Grim Reapers' name is also used by other clubs, in Canada and the United Kingdom, and was formerly used by motorcycle clubs in New Zealand, Australia and California.

See also
Motorcycling

References

External links

Outlaw motorcycle clubs
Gangs in the United States
Organizations based in Louisville, Kentucky
1965 establishments in Kentucky
Motorcycle clubs in the United States
Crime in Louisville, Kentucky